Gaochang is the only district and the seat of the oasis city of Turpan, in the Xinjiang Uyghur Autonomous Region of the People's Republic of China.

Name
According to the municipal government of Turpan, the district is named after the ancient city of Gaochang. It was also proposed that the district be named after Ayding Lake.

History
The district was created on 12 April 2015 after Turpan was upgraded from a county-level city into a prefecture-level city. The district has the same size and population as the former Turpan county-level city.

Demographics

Subdivisions
Karahoja is divided into 3 subdistricts, 2 towns, 7 townships and 3 other township-level divisions.
 Laocheng Subdistrict (老城街道)
 Gaochang Subdistrict (高昌街道)
 Putaoguo Subdistrict (葡萄沟街道)
 Qiquanhu (七泉湖镇)
 Daheyan (大河沿镇)
 Yar Township (亚尔乡)
 Aidinghu Township (艾丁湖乡)
 Putao Township (葡萄乡)
 Qiatekale Township (恰特喀勒乡)
 Erbao Township (二堡乡)
 Sanbao Township (三堡乡)
 Shengjin Township (胜金乡)
 Hongliuhe Horticultural Farm (红柳河园艺场)
 Yuanzhong Farm (原种场)
 XPCC 221 Regiment (兵团二二一团)

Climate 

Gaochang District has a cold-desert climate (Köppen climate classification Dwa).

References

Turpan